Dodie Kazanjian (born 1952) is an American writer who specializes in the arts. She is the author or co-author of several books and currently is a contributing editor for Vogue magazine and director of Gallery Met at the Metropolitan Opera in New York City.

Life and career
Kazanjian, an Armenian-American, was born in 1952 in Newport, Rhode Island. She attended Salve Regina College, graduating in 1974, when she joined Vogue for a brief stint as an editorial assistant. Subsequently she studied at the Colgate Darden Graduate School of Business Administration of the University of Virginia.

In 1977 she became a feature writer for The Washington Post, then moved to a similar position with the Washington Star the following year. In 1981 she went to work in the White House as deputy press secretary to First Lady Nancy Reagan, a position she held until 1983, when she became Washington editor of House & Garden magazine and communications director for the National Endowment for the Arts (NEA), as well as editor-in-chief of the NEA"s magazine, ArtsReview.

Since 1989, she has worked as a contributing editor for Vogue magazine. In 2005 she also became director of Gallery Met at the Metropolitan Opera in New York City. In 1995 she became a contributor to The New Yorker magazine, writing several articles for the magazine in the mid-1990s.

She is married to Calvin Tomkins, a long-time art critic for The New Yorker, with whom she co-wrote a biography of Alexander Liberman. The couple lives in New York City.

Books
Who Supports the Artist, National Endowment for the Arts (1987)
Opera Today, National Endowment for the Arts (1988)
Alex: The Life of Alexander Liberman, co-author with Calvin Tomkins,  Knopf, (1993) 
Icons: The Absolutes of Style, St. Martin's Press (1995)
Dodie Goes Shopping, St. Martin's Press (1999)
Our City Dreams, co-author with Chiara Clemente; about five artists -- Swoon, Ghada Amer, Kiki Smith,  Marina Abramović and Nancy Spero—who "each possess a passion for making work that is inseparable from their devotion to New York," according to the publisher; followed a documentary of the same name by Clemente; Charta, 2009.

References

1952 births
American magazine journalists
American non-fiction writers
Living people
Vogue (magazine) people
University of Virginia Darden School of Business alumni
American women non-fiction writers
21st-century American women
American people of Armenian descent